Fire Crackers is a British television sitcom that aired from 29 August 1964 to 20 February 1965. Two series were produced, for a total of 13 episodes. The series was produced by Associated Television (ATV), and aired on ITV. Unlike many British series of the 1960s, the series survives intact in the archives.

Episodes

Series 1
 "Semi Detached" (aired 29 August 1964)
 "Wanted: One Fire" (aired 5 September 1964)
 "Objective Case" (aired 12 September 1964)
 "Fire Belle for Five" (aired 19 September 1964)
 "Blue Blooded Buddy" (aired 26 September 1964)
 "Power Crazy" (aired 3 October 1964)

Series 2
 "The Business as Usual" (aired 9 January 1965)
 "Strictly for the Birds" (aired 16 January 1965)
 "Pie in the Sky" (aired 23 January 1965)
 "Slap on the Map" (aired 30 January 1965)
 "The Willie Waghorn Story" (aired 6 February 1965)
 "Beautiful Dreamer" (aired 13 February 1965)
 "Saved by the Bell" (aired 20 February 1965)

References

External links
 

1960s British sitcoms
1964 British television series debuts
1965 British television series endings
Black-and-white British television shows
English-language television shows
ITV sitcoms
Television shows produced by Associated Television (ATV)